Khošāl Khān Khaṭak  (1613 – 25 February 1689; Pashto: خوشال خان خټک), also known as Khushal Baba, was a Pashtun poet, chief, and warrior. Khushal Khan served the Mughal Empire protecting them from Pashtun warriors over most of his lifespan. After being expelled from his tribal chiefdom and replaced with his son by his Mughal superiors, Khushal Khan turned against the Mughals. Afterwards, Khushal preached the union of all Pashtuns, and encouraged revolt against the Mughal Empire, promoting Pashtun nationalism in the last years of his life through poetry. Khushal wrote many works in Pashto but also a few in Persian. Khushal is considered the "father of Pashto literature" and the national poet of Afghanistan.

Khushal's life was spent in serving the Mughal emperor and in his last years he struggled against the Mughal Empire who had fluctuating relations with the Pashtuns in what is now Khyber Pakhtunkhwa province and the former Federally Administered Tribal Areas of Pakistan and Zabulistan. In order to restore his position as chief, Khushal challenged the powers of the Mughal emperor Aurangzeb and defeated the Mughal troops in many engagements. He was a renowned military fighter who became known as a "Pashtun warrior-poet". The stand and fight attitude of Khushal was an important stance in pashtun history, and his opinions and ideas form a new stage in the ideological and intellectual development of the Afghans. Besides poetry and prose works, Khushal also wrote various translations from Persian and Arabic into Pashto. He was later killed by the Mughals in his home town.

Early life 
Khushal was born in or about 1613 in the Khattak tribe of the Pashtun people. He was the son of Malik Shahbaz Khattak from Akora, in the Mughal Empire (now in Nowshera District, Khyber Pakhtunkhwa, Pakistan). His grandfather, Malik Akoray, was the first Khattak to enjoy widespread fame during the reign of the Mughal emperor Akbar. Akoray moved from Teri (a village in Karak District) to Sarai Akora, the town which Akoray founded and built. Akoray cooperated with the Mughals to safeguard the trunk route and was generously rewarded for his assistance. The Akor Khels, a clan named after Akoray, still hold a prominent position in the Khattak tribe. The Khattak tribe of Khushal Khan now mostly lives in areas of Karak, Kohat, Nowshera, Akora Khattak, Cherat, Peshawar, Mardan and in other parts of the Khyber Pakhtunkhwa.

Khushal's life can be divided into two important parts — during his adult life he was mostly engaged in the service of the Mughal king, and during his old age he was preoccupied with the idea of the unification of the Pashtuns.

He was an intelligent and bold person from childhood. His first involvement in war occurred when he was just 13 years old. Apart from the fact that he was a scholar, thinker, philosopher and boisterous poet he was a prince and leaders of his tribe simultaneously. His forefathers were since the 16th century officers of the Mughal Empire. After the death of his father Shahbaz Khan Khattak, Emperor Shah Jehan appointed him as the tribal chief and Mansabdar in 1641 at the age of 28.  The Mughal king shah Jahan appreciated his principality. After the death of shah Jahan his relations with Aurangzeb deteriorated. Aurangzeb arrested Khushal . In 1658, Aurangzeb, Shah Jehan's successor, threw him away as a prisoner in the Gwalior fortress. There he was a prisoner for some time and later under detention in the mountains prison. When he returned, he dissociated himself from the Mughal Empire slowly and started with his resistance later. He took contact to other Pashtun tribes and with support of his people he started a systematic resistance against the Mughals.

Family background 
Khushal's grandfather Malik Akoray Khan was a chief of his tribe but when he died his son Shahbaz Khan Khattak became the chief of the Khattaks. Shahbaz Khan Khattak was a prominent soldier in Mughal army. He was a brave man who fought many wars against Yousafzai tribe. This brave man is the father of Khushal. He also proved his bravery in fighting with [Afridi] and later on with Mugahl army that he got the name of swordsman. Khushal was the elder son of Shahbaz Khan Khattak. Once a battle was fought between the Khattaks and the Yusufzai at this time Khushal was only thirteen years old even then he joined this battle with his father. It means he was by birth a swordsman a necessary skill for a chieftain/ leader.

As a follower of Sheikh Rahamkar 
Khushal followed the Sufi Saint Sayyid Kastir Gul, known as Sheikh Rahamkar or Kaka Sahib and was trained by him in islamic sciences.

Shortly before Sayyid Kastir Gul passed away, he issued the following will of his:

“in this age, no one can be as pious and virtuous as Khushal
Khan is. I would like him to give me the final ritual bath and
bury me with his own hands if it is possible for him.”:

Khushal substantiated Pashtun Nationalism, hinting that the Pashtuns were blessed with the shrine of "The Kaka", meaning Sayyid Kastir in their land and that the decrets of Kaka Sahib shall be regarded as law abiding on all Pashtuns.  In honor of his master Sayyid Kastir Gul, he centered his revolution at the shrine of Sayyid Kastir and announced assemblies (Jirgas) there. Sayyid Kastir´s descendants, the Kaka Khel were given much influence.

Khushal´s daughter married Sayyid Ziauddin Shaheed, the son of Sayyid Kastir Gul.

Rebellion and the Moghul Empire 
His father Malik Shahbaz Khan Khattak was killed in a tribal clash against the Yusufzai tribe on 4 January 1641. After his father's death, Mughal Emperor Shah Jahan appointed him as the tribal chief and Mansabdar in 1641 at the age of 28. The Mughal king Shah Jahan appreciated his principality. Then Aurangzeb (the son of Shah Jahan) imprisoned his father and ordered the beheading of his brothers ; so he made his way to the throne. Aurangzeb arrested Khushal In 1658. He threw him away as a prisoner in the Gwalior Fortress. There he had as a prisoner or later and-Delhi-spent under detention in the mountains prison. He later release from captivity in 1668. After Khushal was permitted to return to the Pashtun dominated areas, Khushal had been deadly shocked by the unfriendly treatment, he received from Mughal authorities and king Aurangzeb whose indifference and coolness towards his plight had wounded Khushal's ego. He used to say, "I had done nothing wrong against the interests of the king or the empire". Mughal authorities continued to offer him with temptations in order to reclaim him to their service but Khushal resisted all such offers and made it clear to the Mughals that "I served your cause to the best of my honesty, I subdued and killed my own Pashtuns to promote the Empire’s interests but my services and my loyalty did not make me a Mughal". According to Khushal, he was burning from inside for exacting revenge but preferred to keep silent. Nevertheless, the Mughals were not inclined to bear his aloofness and therefore he was challenged either "to be friend or foe" as the interests of empire knew no impartiality. Khushal decided to be a foe and joined Darya Khan Afridi and Aimal Khan Mohmand in their fight and wars against Mughals. He dissociated himself from the Mughal Empire slowly and started with his resistance later,he incited the Afghan tribes to rebel against the Mughal Emperor Aurangzeb. He took contact to other Pashtoon tribes and with support of his people he started a systematic resistance against the Mughals. Khushal joined a rebellion of Khattak, Momand, Safi  and Afridi tribes against the Mughols. In the Mughal Empire, The Pashtun tribesmen of the Empire were considered the bedrock of the Mughal Army. They were the Empire's northwestern defense from the threat bulwark in the North-West as well as the main fighting force against the Sikhs in the Punjab and Marathas in the Deccan. The Pashtun revolt in 1672 began under the leadership of the warrior poet Khushal Khan Khattak. The revolt was triggered when Mughal soldiers under the orders of the Mughal Governor Amir Khan allegedly attempted to molest and sexually touch a woman of the Safi tribe in modern-day Kunar. The Safi tribe retaliated and killed the Mughal soldiers. This attack provoked a reprisal, which triggered a general revolt by most of the Pashtun tribes. The Mughal King Aurangzeb ordered the Safi tribal elders to hand over the killers. The Safi, Afridi, Mohmand, Shinwari and Khattak tribes came together to protect the Safi men accused of badal. Attempting to reassert his authority, Amir Khan on the orders of Aurangzeb led a large Mughal Army to the Khyber Pass, where the army was surrounded by Pashtun tribesmen and routed. Afghan sources claim that Aurangzeb suffered a humiliating defeat, with a reported loss of 40,000 Mughal soldiers and with only four men, including the Governor managing to escape. In a Battle he lost his Dear and Trustworthy friends Aimal Khan Mohmand and Darya Khan Afridi.Khushal greatly praised the bravery and courage of Darya Khan Afridi and Aimal Khan Mohmand who had destroyed the entire Mughal army in Khyber in 1672. As he said about his these two close companions:"Aimal Khan Mohmand and Darya Khan Afridi from death God preserve them, Never have they failed me at the time of need"

After that the revolt spread, with the Mughals suffering a near total collapse of their authority along the Pashtun belt. The closure of the important Attock-to-Kabul trade route along the Grand Trunk road was particularly critical. By 1674, the situation had deteriorated to a point where Aurangzeb himself camped at Attock to personally take charge. Switching to diplomacy and bribery along with force of arms, the Mughals eventually split the rebellion and while they never managed to wield effective authority outside the main trade route, the revolt was partially suppressed. However, the long term anarchy on the Mughal frontier that prevailed as a consequence ensured that Nader Shah's Khorasanian forces half a century later faced little resistance on the road to Delhi.

Death and tribute 
Khushal continued to resist the Mughals on war fronts.  It must also be worth mentioning that the son of Khushal Khan Khattak named as "Behram Khan Khattak" also turned to be enemy of Khushal Khan Khattak. He wanted to snatch the eldery position of the tribe and joined hands with mughals to kill his own father. The hate for Behram khan is also depicted from the poetry of Khushal Khan khattak. These wars according to historians shook the foundations of the Mughal Empire. Khushal visited the far flung areas, met with Pashtun tribal chiefs, particularly the Yousafzais, negotiated with them to bring about unity in Pashtun ranks against Mughals but failed in his efforts and returned broken hearted. After failing to unite the Pashtun tribes, Khushal retired as a warrior and focused on writing. Khushal had written many poems mostly patriotic about his roots, about his tribe, about his nation and triumphs over invaders. Upon his retirement, his 57 sons began fighting for leadership. Meanwhile, the Mughals had bribed his son Behram Khan to arrest or to kill Khushal. Bahram joined forces with Mughals set to capture his father, and before he could do so, Khushal Khan fled into Afridi territory in Tirah assisted by his two sons Nusrat Khan and Gohar Khan. Khushal died at the age of 76 on Friday, 20 February 1689 at Dambara. People searched for him and found his dead body a number of days later with his sword and the carcass of his horse (known as "Silai" in Pashto, which means Wind).

The art of chieftainship thou hast not learned, bahram
in your time you have dishonored the chieftainship
from now on don't count yourself amongst my sons
that is the last prayer breathed by Khushal the Khattak
He desired before his death that he should be buried in a place where "the dust of Mughal horses’ hoofs may not fall on his grave." His wishes were carried out by his friend and his remains were laid at‘Chashmai’ village in the Akora Khattak in Khattaks hills, where many Pashtuns continue to pay tribute and visit his tomb. His grave carries the inscription: "Da Afghan Pa nang mai watarala toora, nangyalai da zamanai Khushal Khattak Yam" (trans.: "I have taken up the sword to defend the pride of the Afghan, I am Khushal Khattak, the honorable man of the age.")

Allama Muhammad Iqbal called Khushal the Hakeem and Tabeeb (physician) of Afghan Millat and Afghan Shanas. Maj: Roverty and certain other orientalists say that Khushal was not only Afghan Shanas but like Goethe and Shakespeare he was also a great Insan- Shanas (one who knows man) Iqbal expressed his desire that if he knew Pashto he would have translated Khushal's poetry into Urdu or Persian.

Khushal was a practical man. He manifested all those qualities in his living conduct which he wanted to see in a man. Allama Muhammad Iqbal, the national poet of Pakistan, said about Khushal:

That Afghan shanas (Khushal Khan Khattak) said well,

He expressed what he saw save any hesitation.
He was the Hakeem (Philosopher) of Afghan nation.
He was the physician of Afghan cause.
He stated the secrets of nation boldly.
He was rendering and said the right very wisely.

At another place he commends Khushal in these words:

I am tribal and am lost in the unity of nation.
To elevate the name of Afghans
I love these young people who puts the halter on stars
This son of mountains is never less than the Mughals
O’companion! May I tell you the secrets of my heart?
Khushal Khan likes that grave where the dust of Mughal’s horse’s boots could not fall.

Struggle for peace and national integrity 
Khushal's struggled for peace gradually changed into national integrity. He expected that his struggle will ultimately bring peace in the region and his own nation (Pashtuns) will get freedom form the Mughal emperors. For this purpose, he tried to unite Pashtuns owing to this he traveled from the mountains of Tirah to Swat. To some extent, he seems successful by uprising the name of Pashtuns. He says about them in the following couplet: "If I have girded up my sword against the Mughals I have revealed all the Pashtuns to the world." He further says about his tribe that due to his struggle they got recognition in the world: "Of what worth, of what value were the Khattaks (but) I have made them to be counted among the tribes".

The above couplets make it clear that Khushal's war were not based on his personal greed or enmity. Fighting for the defense of motherland and for the rights of his compatriots is the struggle of peace and that is a noble cause. He fought up to the end of his life for the rights of oppressed people and for thefreedom of his mother land. Thus, all of his struggles were for the establishment of peace.

Published works 
Khushal's poetry consists of more than 45,000 poems. According to some historians, the number of books written by Khattak are 260. His more famous books are Bāz-nāma, a manual of falconry, Swāt-nāma, a description of a journey to the beautiful Swat Valley, Fazl-nāma, a handbook on religious and social duties, Tibb-nāma, a book on homely medicinal recipes, Farrukh-nāma, a dialogue between the pen and the sword, and Firāq-nāma, a lament of his separation from his homeland during captivity. Khushal also wrote many ghazals in Persian under the pen-name Rūhī, and a Persian qasida on the futility of the world.

H. G. Raverty was the first translator of Khattak into English; Selections from the Poetry of Afghans (1862, Kolkata) has ninety eight poetic pieces. This was followed by Biddulph's translation Selections from the Poetry of Khushhal Khan Khattak in 1890 published in London. Evelyn Howell and Olaf Caroe jointly translated and published The Poems of Khushhal Khan Khatak in 1963, from the University of Peshawar. Another translation was that by Dr N. Mackenzie Poems from the Diwan of Khushhal Khan Khattak published from London in 1965.

Dost Mohammad Khan Kamil was the first Pashtun scholar to initiate research on Khattak along scientific lines. He wrote two important and comprehensive books, one in English called On a Foreign Approach to Khushhal and the other in Urdu titled Khushhal Khan Khattak published in 1952. Diwan-i-Khushhal Khan Khattak was published under the directive of H .W. Bellew in 1869 (Jail Press, Peshawar), the manuscript of which was provided by Sultan Bakhash Darogha, an employee of the British government. More recently his poetry has been translated again.

In October 2002, a book on Khushal, Khushal Khan, The Afghan Warrior Poet and Philosopher, was published. It is sponsored by Pashtun Cultural Society and Pashto Adabi Society of Islamabad/Rawalpindi. The book is written by a well-known writer and scholar, Ghani Khan Khattak, who is reputed for having established the literary and cultural societies, and for promoting Pashto literary and cultural activities in the capital of Pakistan, Islamabad. The significance of the book lies in that this is the first book in English on Khushal. Most of the written material available on Khattak is either in Pashto, Persian or Urdu. Although orientalists have always given importance to Khattak in their findings but they have not ever presented a detailed life story of Khushal Khan.

Ghani Khan Khattak has also authored three more books on the Khan i.e. in Urdu, Pashto and another in English, an improved version on his previous book " Khushal Khan Afghan warrior Poet and Philosopher." The book in Urdu, published in 2009 i.e. خوشحال خان افغان قومی شاعر و فلاسفر gives extensive coverage to the Khushal's philosophical thoughts. The author's Pashto book خوشحال دَ ننګيال او سردار په لټون کښې deals with his thoughts on ننګيال, the Hero and سردار, the Sovereign. The book was published in 2011. In his recent attempt on Khushal," Khushal, life, thoughts and contemporary Pakhtuns,"published in March, 2014 is aimed at giving projection to the time and life of the great Khan for the benefit of English readers in Afghanistan, Pakistan and beyond.

Poetry
 Diwan (consisting of nearly 16000 couplets)
 Sahat u Badan: A long verse deals with pathology of human body.
 Tib Nama
 Fazal Nama: Deals with religious proposition.
 Swat Nama: Narration of his visit to Swat Valley.
 Farrukh Nama: A dialogue between Pen and Sword.
 Faraq Nama: Narration of the days in Mughal internment and exile.
 Swat Nama

Prose
 Baz Nama: A detailed study regarding rearing of his hawks.
 Tarjuma Hadia: Explains various aspects of Fiqha Hanafia.
 Aaina: A Pashto translation of an Arabic book on Fiqha.
 Baiaz: Memories of life.
 Zanziri: Deals with the principles of shorthand.
 Dastar Nama: about how a leader should act

Quotes 
 "The very name Pashtun spells honor and glory; Lacking that honor, what is the Afghan story? In the sword alone lies our deliverance."
 "I despise the man who does not guide his life by honour. The very word  “honour” drives me mad."

Legacy 
There is a University in Karak, Khyber Pakhtunkhwa, named after Khushal Khan Khattak. A train service, the Khushhal Khan Khattak Express, is also named after him.
Allama Iqbal dedicated a poem titled  'Khushhal Khan ki Wasiyat' to him.

See also

Nazo Tokhi
Rahman Baba
Ahmad Shah Durrani
Nowshera district

References

Further reading

External links

Biography of Khushal Khan Khattak

1613 births
1689 deaths
17th-century Afghan people
Pashto-language poets
Pashtun people
Pashtun nationalists
Mughal Empire poets
People from Nowshera District